Polyeucte is an overture composed by Paul Dukas in 1891 for the tragedy of the same name by Pierre Corneille. Dukas made his public debut with the first performance of this overture on 23 January 1892 at the Concerts Lamoureux.

External links

Compositions by Paul Dukas
1891 compositions
Overtures
Adaptations of works by Pierre Corneille